Chaoite, an allotrophe of carbon
Precipitated silica, not carbon, also called 'white carbon black'